South Carolina Highway 319 (SC 319) is a  state highway in Horry County, within the northeastern part of the U.S. state of South Carolina. It travels from U.S. Route 701 in Homewood to US 501 in Aynor.

History

This road was formerly known as the Galivants Ferry Road.

Major intersections

See also

References

External links

SC 319 at Virginia Highways' South Carolina Highways Annex

319
Transportation in Horry County, South Carolina